Champagne Papi may refer to:

 Drake (musician), a Canadian rapper
 "Champagne Papi" (Atlanta), an episode of American TV series Atlanta
 Viraj Mody (tech executive), an Indian American co-founder and CTO.